Artillerivollen  is a neighbourhood in the city of Kristiansand in Agder county, Norway. It is located in the borough of Grim and in the district of Grim. Artillerivollen is north of Grimsmyra and the Norwegian National Road 9, and east of Enrum.

Transport

References

Geography of Kristiansand
Neighbourhoods of Kristiansand